Gianluigi Placella (born 19 March 1948) is an Italian fencer. He competed in the team épée event at the 1972 Summer Olympics.

References

External links
 

1948 births
Living people
Italian male fencers
Olympic fencers of Italy
Fencers at the 1972 Summer Olympics
Fencers from Naples